Cleveland County Courthouse may refer to:

Cleveland County Courthouse (Arkansas), Rison, Arkansas
Cleveland County Courthouse (North Carolina), Shelby, North Carolina
Cleveland County Courthouse (Oklahoma), Norman, Oklahoma, listed on the National Register of Historic Places